The HNA Building, also known as the New Haihang Building or Xin Haihang Dasha, is the headquarters for Hainan Airlines and the HNA Group. It is located at the west end of Guoxing Avenue on the north side of the road, in Haikou, Hainan, China.

Gallery

References

External links
 

Hainan Airlines
HNA Group
Office buildings completed in 2008
Buildings and structures in Haikou
Articles containing video clips
2008 establishments in China
Skyscrapers in Haikou